Herbie Goes Bananas is a 1980 American adventure comedy film directed by Vincent McEveety and written by Don Tait. The film is the fourth installment in the Herbie film series and the sequel to Herbie Goes to Monte Carlo (1977).

Herbie Goes Bananas was followed by the television film The Love Bug (1997).

Plot
Picking up sometime after the Trans-France Race, Pete Stancheck has inherited Herbie from his uncle, Jim Douglas and travels to Puerto Vallarta, Mexico with his friend Davy "D.J." Johns  to retrieve the car. They get directions from Paco, a comically mischievous, orphaned pickpocket to the car lot. Unable to pay the holding fee due to Paco taking their wallets, the pair quickly leave in Herbie to find him. Elsewhere, Paco pickpockets one of the members of a trio of three villains who are planning to steal gold from some forgotten Inca ruins. The trio chase Paco after realizing the film showing the location of the gold is in the stolen wallet, but Pete and DJ catch him first.

Paco hides in Herbie's hood, and is consequently loaded on the Sun Princess cruise ship, bound for Rio de Janeiro, where Pete and DJ plan to enter Herbie in the Brazil Grand Prêmio. En route, they meet an anthropology student named Melissa  and her extravagant, eccentric aunt Louise, who is trying to find a husband for her niece. When Herbie wreaks havoc on board, Pete pretends to court Melissa, intending that her Aunt Louise will sponsor their race.

Meanwhile, Paco is discovered by the crew and locked in the hold by Captain Blythe. Herbie (whom Paco calls "Ocho") helps Paco escape, and they ruin the ship's costume party while trying to escape the crew. Captain Blythe has Herbie dropped into the sea, while Pete, DJ, Melissa and Aunt Louise are ordered off at the next port. Paco evades the police sent to pick him up, ending up at a inlet, where he rescues the rusty Herbie when he resurfaces from the water. The pair then goes into business with Herbie as a taxi.

The gold thieves soon find Paco, and threaten to use an acetylene torch to cut up Herbie if Paco doesn't give them the film, which Paco put in Pete's wallet by mistake. Paco manages to get Pete's wallet, but as he and Herbie escape the men they are hailed by both Louise and Blythe. Melissa quickly commandeers a dilapidated bus so she, Pete and Davy can go after them, Paco explains the situation to their unhappy passengers. 

Herbie tries to hide from the men at a bullfight, only for him and two of the men to end up in the ring. After the bull is defeated by Herbie, he and Paco leave without Louise and Blythe, who are soon picked up by Pete, DJ and Louise, where they explain what's happening. Later at a café, Paco is grabbed by the men. After failing to stop their plane taking off, Herbie goes to find Pete and the others, who are stuck in a small village after the bus finally broke down.

As a rainstorm hits, the men retrieve a large gold disc from the ruins, planning to sell it so they can hire equipment to get the rest. They leave Paco to fend for himself, but Herbie finds him and chases after the men, catching the gold in his trunk. 

Herbie and the group travel to the next major town (using bananas as camouflage) where Blythe and Louise go to get help while the others take the disc to the local university, where they are overpowered by the men. Paco is outside selling the bananas to locals when he and Herbie see the men loading the disc into their plane. Herbie throws the bananas at them before chasing the plane and 'biting' its tail off. 

The villains are defeated by Herbie and Paco and they get arrested by the police, and the group reunite on the Sun Princess. Pete and DJ resume their plans to enter a repainted and restored Herbie in the Brazil Grand Prêmio with Paco dressed as the driver (Pete concedes that Paco and Herbie have a better connection than Pete would have if he drove Herbie in the race). DJ finally asks Paco why he keeps referring to Herbie as "Ocho", since that is Spanish for eight. Paco looks at Herbie's "53" and remarks that 5+3=8. Aunt Louise once again tries to get Blythe to notice her, but he is more interested in a passing schooner. 

After that Pete, Davy, Aunt Louise, and Melissa have a toast hoping for Herbie to win the race with Paco giving Herbie a thumbs up.

Cast

 Cloris Leachman as Aunt Louise Trends
 Charles Martin Smith as Davy "D.J." Johns
 John Vernon as Prindle
 Stephan W. Burns as Peter "Pete" Stancheck
 Elyssa Davalos as Melissa
 Joaquin Garay III as Paco
 Harvey Korman as Captain Blythe
 Richard Jaeckel as Shepard
 Alex Rocco as Quinn
 Fritz Feld as Chief Steward
 Vito Scotti as Armando Moccia
 Jose Gonzales-Gonzales as Garage Owner
 Ruben Moreno as Store Owner 
 Tina Menard as Store Owner's Wife 
 Jorge Moreno as Bus Driver
 Allan Hunt as Canal Operator #2
 Tom Scott as Canal Operator #2 
 Hector Morales as Mexican General 
 Iris Adrian as Loud American Wife
 Ceil Cabot as Mrs. Purkiss 
 Pat Van Patten as Cigarette Guest 
 Jack Perkins as Loud American 
 Henry Slate as Off-Watch Officer 
 Ernie Fuentes as Native 
 Antonio Trevino as Pigeon Owner 
 Dante D'Andre as Dr. De Moraes 
 Alma Beltran as General's Wife 
 Dolores Aguirre as General's Daughter #1
 Aurora Coria as General's Daughter #2
 Alex Tinne as Local #1
 Don Diamond as Local #2
 Warde Donovan as Maitre d' 
 Ray Victor as Guard Attendant 
 Bert Santos as Policeman #3
 Buddy Joe Hooker as Chef
 Steve Boyum as Panama Policeman 
 Kenny Endoso as Mexican Policeman 
 Mario Cisneros as Puetro Vallarta Policeman 
 Jeff Ramsey as The Matador
 John Meier as Ship's Officer

Reception
Herbie Goes Bananas was poorly received and is widely considered to be the weakest film in the Herbie franchise. Most film critics remarked that the series felt tired, and had run its course, with Leonard Maltin commenting that there was "one amusing scene where the VW turns matador; otherwise, strictly scrap metal." Maltin (who rated the film 1½ out of 4) added that the plot dealt with its cast "encountering all sorts of 'hilarious' obstacles along the way." Phil Patton, author of the book Bug: The Strange Mutations of the World's Most Famous Automobile, observed that the Herbie franchise was "a game of diminishing returns: Herbie Goes Bananas...is filled with 'south of the border' clichés and stereotypes." The film has a 40% rating on the website Rotten Tomatoes, while on Metacritic, it has a weighted average score of 55 out of 100 based on 4 critic reviews, indicating "mixed or average reviews".

Cars
The prop Herbie dropped into the ocean was never retrieved. A total of 26 VW Beetles were used, by reason of the quantity of stunts and tricks.

Novelization
A paperback novelization of the film was written by Joe Claro and published by Scholastic Paperbacks in July 1980 to coincide with the film's release.

Home media
Herbie Goes Bananas was released on VHS in late 1984 and re-released on November 6, 1985 and September 16, 1997. It was first released on DVD in Region 1 on May 4, 2004 and re-released on DVD on September 2, 2012 as part of Herbie: 4-Movie Collection with The Love Bug, Herbie Rides Again and Herbie Goes to Monte Carlo.

On June 30, 2015, Herbie Goes Bananas was released on Blu-ray Disc as a Disney Movie Club exclusive title.

References

External links

1980 films
1980s adventure comedy films
American adventure comedy films
American sequel films
American children's comedy films
4
Films scored by Frank De Vol
Films set in Mexico
Films shot in Central America
Films shot in Panama
Films shot in Mexico
Films about automobiles
Films about orphans
Walt Disney Pictures films
Films directed by Vincent McEveety
Films produced by Ron W. Miller
1980 comedy films
1980s English-language films
1980s American films